Egridere may refer to:

 Eğridere, Turkish name of Ardino, a town in Southern Bulgaria
 Eğridere, Biga
 Eğridere, Sındırgı, a village
 Eğridere, Yenipazar, a village in Aydın Province, Turkey
 Seda Egridere (born 1982), Turkish actress and film director

See also